New Negro Alliance v. Sanitary Grocery Co., 303 U.S. 552 (1938), was a landmark decision of the US Supreme Court which affects US labor law, safeguarding a right to boycott and in the struggle by African Americans against discriminatory hiring practices.  Sanitary Grocery Co. was at the time of the case owned by Safeway Inc.

Judgment
The court concluded that according to the United States Congress "peaceful and orderly dissemination of information by those defined as persons interested in a labor dispute concerning 'terms and conditions of employment' in an industry or a plant or a place of business should be lawful; that, short of fraud, breach of the peace, violence, or conduct otherwise unlawful, those having a direct or indirect interest in such terms and conditions of employment should be at liberty to advertise and disseminate facts and information with respect to terms and conditions of employment, and peacefully to persuade others to concur in their views respecting an employer's practices."

See also
US labor law
List of United States Supreme Court cases, volume 303

References

External links
 
 
 New Negro Alliance's Sanitary Grocery Protest Site

United States Supreme Court cases
United States Supreme Court cases of the Hughes Court
United States labor case law
History of labor relations in the United States
1938 in United States case law
African-American history between emancipation and the civil rights movement
Civil rights movement case law
United States racial discrimination case law